Bernard Food Industries is an American food products corporation. It is part of a family business started in 1947. Bernard Food Industries is headquartered in Evanston, Illinois, a Chicago suburb. The company was founded by Jules Bernard and is currently controlled by Steven Bernard.

Its brands include the Bernard, Calorie Control, Sweet'N Low, Sans Sucre and Longhorn Grill.

The company has produced, for some years, empty tin cans, labelled as "Bernard Dehydrated Water", as a novelty item.

References

External links
Bernard Food Industries Corporate Website

Companies based in Evanston, Illinois